Babine Mountains Provincial Park is a provincial park in British Columbia, Canada, located to the east of the Bulkley River between the town of Smithers (SW) and Babine Lake (NE).  Established by Order-in-Council as the Babine Mountains Recreation Area in 1984, it was upgraded to park status and its name changed in 1999.  It contains approximately 31,465 hectares.

The park is home to black bears, ground squirrels, moose, marmot, and several species of birds. On occasion, grizzly bears, lynx, and wolverines have been sighted as well.

External links

Provincial parks of British Columbia
Bulkley Valley
1984 establishments in British Columbia
Protected areas established in 1984